Finland Proper or Southwest Finland is a historical province in southwestern Finland, administered by its historic capital of Turku. It borders Satakunta, Tavastia, and Uusimaa. It is also bounded by the Baltic sea facing Åland. There was also a modern region by the name Finland Proper.

Southwest Finnish dialects are spoken in Southwest Finland.

Administration 
Southwest Finland was within the boundaries of the administrative province of Turku and Pori from 1917 to 1997 and that of Western Finland from 1997 to 2009, when the provinces of Finland were abolished.

History 
The province, which had been a part of Sweden from the 13th century, separated when Finland was ceded to the Russian Empire in 1809. The provinces have no administrative function today but live on as a historical legacy in both countries. Originally "Finland" referred only to this region but later replaced the traditional Österland ("Eastern land") in meaning.

Heraldry 
Arms granted at the burial of Gustav I of Sweden in 1560. The arms is crowned by a ducal coronet, though by Finnish tradition this more resembles a Swedish comital coronet. Blazon: "Gules, a crowned jousting helmet in front of two lances in saltire, all Or. On each lance is attached a forked hanging flag azure, charged with a Scandinavian cross Or."

Historical provinces of Finland
Historical
Western Finland Province
Metropolitan or continental parts of states